David Allan Gee (c. 1929 – 13 June 2013) was a Chinese Australian coin expert, dealer, collector, and forger. Born Yon Chu Chee in the province of Guangzhou, he arrived in Australia in June 1939 aboard the SS Changtsu. In 1963 he was found guilty of two charges of possessing false die plates resembling those used for the production of postage stamps.

He became a coin dealer and exhibitor of adult films. Gee created forgeries of some of Australia's rarest coins. In 1979, he was sentenced to seven years gaol for forging coins.

According to his friend Jim Henderson, controller of the Royal Australian Mint, "the twelve-sided design for the nation's fifty cent piece was substantially Gee's." Gee died in June 2013.

References

Further reading
 Jeffrey Watson, Don Thomas, and Jack Bennett, Heads I win: the true story of David Gee, Australia's most audacious coin forger (1986).

1929 births
2013 deaths
People convicted of forgery
Australian counterfeiters
Chinese counterfeiters
Chinese emigrants to Australia
Australian numismatists
Australian philatelists
Chinese numismatists
Chinese philatelists